Roman Tomas (born September 9, 1980) is a Slovak former professional ice hockey Forward.

He previously played with HC Vítkovice in the Czech Extraliga during the 2010–11 Czech Extraliga season.

References

External links

1980 births
Living people
Boxers de Bordeaux players
MKS Cracovia (ice hockey) players
HC Košice players
HC Litvínov players
KHL Medveščak Zagreb players
BK Mladá Boleslav players
HC Oceláři Třinec players
Orli Znojmo players
HC Plzeň players
HK Poprad players
Slovak ice hockey forwards
HC Vítkovice players
VHK Vsetín players
MsHK Žilina players
Sportspeople from Poprad
Slovak expatriate sportspeople in France
Slovak expatriate sportspeople in Poland
Slovak expatriate sportspeople in Croatia
Expatriate ice hockey players in Croatia
Expatriate ice hockey players in France
Expatriate ice hockey players in Poland
Slovak expatriate ice hockey players in Russia
Slovak expatriate ice hockey players in the Czech Republic